Paraxanthodes cumatodes is a species of crab found in the Red Sea and the New Caledonian Exclusive Economic Zone.

References

Crustaceans described in 1905